Middle Batkhela is one of three administrative units that forms the union council of Batkhela Tehsil. The other two are the Lower Batkhela and Upper Batkhela in the Khyber Pakhtunkhwa province of Pakistan.

The district of Malakand has two Tehsils known as Swat Ranizai and Sam Ranizai. Each Tehsil comprises a number of union councils. There are 28 union councils in the district of Malakand.

See also 

Malakand District

External links
Khyber-Pakhtunkhwa Government website section on Lower Dir
United Nations
Hajjinfo.org Uploads
PBS paiman.jsi.com

Malakand District
Populated places in Malakand District
Union councils of Khyber Pakhtunkhwa
Union Councils of Malakand District